Nahiyah or subdistrict is the third-level administrative division in Iraq.

Iraq is divided into 18 Muhafazah (See: Governorates of Iraq) which are divided into more than 130 Kaza (See: Districts of Iraq). These districts are divided into subdistricts.

See also
 Governorates of Iraq
 Districts of Iraq

References

 
Sub-districts, Iraq
Subdivisions of Iraq
Iraq 3
Iraq 3
Iraq geography-related lists